Senator Dickey may refer to:

Henry L. Dickey (1832–1910), Ohio State Senate
John Dickey (American politician) (1794–1853), Pennsylvania State Senate